Chris or Christopher Fuller may refer to:

 Chris Fuller (squash player) (born 1990), English squash player
 Chris Fuller (director) (born 1982), American director
 Chris Fuller (academic), British professor of anthropology